Festuca arizonica, commonly called Arizona fescue, is a grass found in western North America, in the southwest United States and northern Mexico.  This species also has the common names mountain bunchgrass and pinegrass.

This grass lacks rhizomes, but it has a large, fibrous root system and it can be used for erosion control. The stems grow up to one meter tall. They are rough-textured and blue-green in color. The rough, blue-green leaf blades are "shaped like a string" and measure up to 10 inches long. The inflorescence is a branching array up to 20 centimeters long which may be narrow or somewhat open in shape.

This grass grows on loams, including clay loams, and gravelly and sandy soil types. It usually grows in ecosystems dominated by the ponderosa pine. It may grow alongside blue grama and mountain muhly grasses. It is tolerant of shade and drought.

This species is somewhat palatable to domestic ungulates, and it provides forage for wild animals such as deer and bighorn sheep. It can be planted in revegetation efforts on reclaimed land such as mine spoils, as long as the area receives adequate precipitation. It can also be used as an ornamental in gardens, but it does not tolerate trampling. The cultivar 'Redondo' is available.

References

External links 
  US Forest Service information
  Picture, map, information, USDA 
  Information, Kew Gardens

arizonica
Grasses of Mexico
Grasses of the United States
Flora of Northwestern Mexico
Flora of the Southwestern United States
Plants described in 1893